Ramy Mohamed Adel Mohamed Shawatta (born August 18, 1979) is an Egyptian footballer, who currently plays as a center-back for Egyptian Premier League club Al-Mokawloon al-Arab.

Club career
Ramy started his career at the youth squad of Al-Mokawloon al-Arab, before he signed to top Egyptian club Al Ahly in summer 2005.
In 2006, he rejoined Al-Mokawloon al-Arab for a one-year loan.

He returned to Al Ahly after the end of his loan spell.
He was loaned again in season 2008-09 for El-Masry club, after disagreements with Al Ahly's coach then Manuel Jose due to being constantly overlooked for a starting spot.

In summer 2009 and after being released from Al Ahly club, Ramy signed a contract to play for the newly promoted to Egyptian Premier League El Gouna club.

References

External links

Living people
1979 births
Egyptian footballers
Egypt international footballers
Al Ahly SC players
Al Masry SC players
Al Mokawloon Al Arab SC players
Egyptian Premier League players
Association football defenders